The chestnut-headed tanager (Pyrrhocoma ruficeps) is a species of bird in the tanager family Thraupidae this is found in the Atlantic Forest of southeast Brazil, eastern Paraguay and far northeastern Argentina. It was formerly the only member of the genus Pyrrhocoma but is now placed in Thlypopsis.

Taxonomy
The chestnut-headed tanager was formally described in 1844 by the English naturalist Hugh Edwin Strickland under the binomial name Tachyphonus ruficeps. The species was subsequently placed in the monotypic genus Pyrrhocoma by the German ornithologist Jean Cabanis. A molecular phylogenetic study published in 2014 found that the chestnut-headed tanager was embedded in a clade containing members of the genus Thlypopsis. The genera were therefore merged but as Thlypopsis already contained the rust-and-yellow tanager as Thlypopsis ruficeps d’Orbigny & Lafresnaye, 1837, a new specific epithet pyrrhocoma was coined for the chestnut-headed tanager, using the earlier generic name "to communicate past taxonomic connections". The name comes from the Ancient Greek purrhokomēs meaning "red-haired". The species is monotypic: no subspecies are recognised.

References

chestnut-headed tanager
Birds of the Atlantic Forest
chestnut-headed tanager
Tanagers